Ángel Calderón de la Barca y Belgrano (2 October 1790 in Buenos Aires, Viceroyalty of the Río de la Plata – 1861) was a Spanish nobleman and politician who served as Minister of State between 1853 and 1854. He was a correspondent of William H. Prescott, the eminent American historian. In 1843, Calderón de la Barca was elected an Associate Fellow of the American Academy of Arts and Sciences. He was married firstly to Isabel Ana de Vera y Sotosánchez and later to Frances Inglis, who wrote a successful book concerning their life in Mexico when de la Barca was stationed there as an envoy. His second wife was granted the Marquisate of Calderón de la Barca in 1876.

Orestes Brownson recounted the following:

In Steven Spielberg's Amistad, Calderón de la Barca is played by Tomas Milian.

References

 

|-

1790 births
1861 deaths
Fellows of the American Academy of Arts and Sciences
Spanish untitled nobility
Foreign ministers of Spain
Moderate Party (Spain) politicians
19th-century Spanish politicians